Mehdiabad (also known as Meydān-e Choghowk) is a village in Kavir Rural District, Sheshtaraz District, Khalilabad County, Razavi Khorasan Province, Iran. At the 2006 census, its population was 1,166, in 336 families.

References 

Populated places in Khalilabad County